Juan Manuel Viale Ochoa (born 9 March 1981) is an Argentine footballer who plays for Spanish club CF Mollet as a central defender.

Football career
Born in Córdoba, Viale played his entire senior career in Spain, but never in higher than Segunda División B. He started out at RCD Mallorca in 1999, but was all but associated with the B-team during his four-year tenure; he appeared in two games with the main squad in the 2000 UEFA Intertoto Cup, both against FC Ceahlăul Piatra Neamț (3–4 aggregate loss).

In the 2008–09 season Viale scored a career-high three goals in 32 games, helping CD Dénia narrowly avoid relegation from the third level.

Personal life
He have a 4 chilldrens: Andrea Viale, Alex Viale, Manel Viale and Martin Viale . Viale's younger brother, Lucas, was also a footballer and a stopper. They shared teams at CE L'Hospitalet and UE Sant Andreu.

References

External links

1981 births
Living people
Argentine people of Italian descent
Argentine people of Ligurian descent
Footballers from Córdoba, Argentina
Argentine footballers
Association football defenders
Segunda División B players
Tercera División players
RCD Mallorca B players
RCD Mallorca players
Ciudad de Murcia footballers
CE Sabadell FC footballers
Zamora CF footballers
UDA Gramenet footballers
UE Figueres footballers
Logroñés CF footballers
CE L'Hospitalet players
UE Sant Andreu footballers
UE Vilassar de Mar players
Argentine expatriate footballers
Expatriate footballers in Spain
Argentine expatriate sportspeople in Spain